The men's single sculls competition at the 2020 Summer Paralympics in Tokyo took place at the Sea Forest Waterway.

Results

Heats
The winner of each heat qualified to the finals, the remainder went to the repechage.

Heat 1

Heat 2

Repechages
The first two of each heat qualified to the finals, the remainder went to Final B.

Repechage 1

Repechage 2

Finals

Final B

Final A

References

Rowing at the 2020 Summer Paralympics